Pinochia is a genus of plants in the family Apocynaceae, first described as a genus in 2007. It is native to  Central America, Mexico, and the West Indies.

Species
 Pinochia corymbosa (Jacq.) M.E.Endress & B.F.Hansen - Cuba, Hispaniola, Puerto Rico
 Pinochia floribunda (Sw.) M.E.Endress & B.F.Hansen - Cuba, Jamaica
 Pinochia monteverdensis (J.F.Morales) M.E.Endress & B.F.Hansen - Oaxaca, Costa Rica, Guatemala
 Pinochia peninsularis (Woodson) M.E.Endress & B.F.Hansen - Belize, Guatemala, Nicaragua, Panama, Chiapas, Tabasco, Campeche

References

Apocynaceae genera
Odontadenieae